Seyyed Khan may refer to either of two villages in Hirmand County, Sistan and Baluchestan Province, Iran:
 Seyyed Khan, Jahanabad
 Seyyed Khan, Qorqori